Lists of state leaders in the 19th century include:

 List of state leaders in the 19th century (1801–1850)
 List of state leaders in the 19th century (1851–1900)
 List of governors of dependent territories in the 19th century
 List of state leaders in 19th-century British South Asia subsidiary states
 List of state leaders in the 19th-century Holy Roman Empire

Rulers
 
-